Sidcup was a parliamentary constituency centred on Sidcup, an outer suburb of London in the London Borough of Bexley.  It returned one Member of Parliament (MP) to the House of Commons of the Parliament of the United Kingdom.

The constituency was created for the February 1974 general election, and abolished for the 1983 general election, when it was partially replaced by the Old Bexley and Sidcup constituency. It was held throughout that time by Edward Heath, who was still Prime Minister for four days between the indecisive February general election and his resignation from the post on 4 March.

Boundaries
The London Borough of Bexley wards of Lamorbey East, Lamorbey West, North Cray, St Mary's, Sidcup East, and Sidcup West.

Members of Parliament

Election results

References

Parliamentary constituencies in London (historic)
Constituencies of the Parliament of the United Kingdom established in 1974
Constituencies of the Parliament of the United Kingdom disestablished in 1983
Constituencies of the Parliament of the United Kingdom represented by a sitting Prime Minister
Sidcup
Edward Heath